Love on Skis is a 1928 German silent comedy film directed by Rolf Randolf and starring Harry Liedtke, Rita Roberts and Georg Henrich. It was shot at the Bavaria Studios in Munich and on location in the Alps. The film's sets were designed by the art director Ludwig Reiber.

Cast
 Harry Liedtke as Erbprinz Heinrich von Altenberg-Gauda
 Rita Roberts as Prinzessin Bettina
 Georg Henrich as Dr. Brinkamm
 Christa Tordy as Elli, seine Tochter
 Lydia Potechina as Rosalinde, seine Schwester
 Willi Forst as Paul Grumbach, Ellis Vetter
 Franz Loskarn as Huber Sepp, Bergführer
 Sylvester Bauriedl as Moritz Bolle, Molkereibesitzer
 Elisabeth Pinajeff as Ida, Ellis Freundin
 Rio Nobile as Graf von Golz

References

Bibliography
 Francesco Bono. Willi Forst: ein filmkritisches Porträt. 2010.

External links

1928 films
Films of the Weimar Republic
German silent feature films
Films directed by Rolf Randolf
Skiing films
German black-and-white films
1928 comedy films
Films set in the Alps
German comedy films
Phoebus Film films
Silent comedy films
1920s German films
Films shot at Bavaria Studios